Max Q Motorsports (formerly Gunselman Motorsports) was a NASCAR Sprint Cup Series team owned by former driver Larry Gunselman. It fielded cars between 2009 and 2013.

Sprint Cup Series

Car No. 37 history
After the Daytona 500 in 2011, Max Q Motorsports struck a deal with Front Row Motorsports to acquire the No. 37 car. The No. 37 became the primary team for Max Q, with Tony Raines driving.  Max Q inherited the owners points from 2010, guaranteeing a spot through the 5th race of 2011, as well as crew chief Greg Connor, the pit crew, and some equipment.  The cars are former FRM cars, sourced from the Max Q Motorsports shop and the team has their own personnel. Tony Raines scored top 25 finishes at Phoenix and at Martinsville. The team picked up sponsorship from BlackCat Fireworks for several races during the summer months. The team has started and parked since the 10th race of the season at Darlington after falling out of the top-35 and missing races. Chris Cook drove the No. 37 after a deal with Tomy Drissi and Rick Ware Racing fell through when Drissi was not approved to race at Sonoma. Scott Speed drove the No. 37 at Indy, Pocono, and Watkins Glen, Speed would go on to join Whitney Motorsports full-time following Watkins Glen. Josh Wise made his Sprint Cup debut in the car at Chicago, and has continued to drive for the team following that race.  Veteran NASCAR driver Mike Skinner ran the car at Martinsville on October 30, 2011.

For 2012, the No. 37 team planned to return full-time in an alliance with Rick Ware Racing. Mike Wallace unsuccessfully attempted the Daytona 500. 2011 Nationwide Series Rookie of the Year Timmy Hill took over in March.  The team had full sponsorship from Poynt, a free mobile app available from the App Store.

Max Q Motorsports scaled back their schedule in April after the team failed to make five of the first six races, including a disqualification at Martinsville after failing post-qualifying inspection, and a deal for Rick Ware to purchase the team fell through. Their only start was at Las Vegas, where Hill finished 42nd after a crash. Midway through the season they entered into a technical agreement with Tommy Baldwin Racing, signing J. J. Yeley to drive the No. 37. Max Q Motorsports started and parked most of the remainder of the season, but went the distance at Homestead with a 35th-place finish.

After 2012, Yeley departed for Tommy Baldwin Racing for the 2013 season.  Yeley had start-and-parked for most of 2012 and was quick to take a ride in which he could race full races.  With the loss of its fifth primary driver since the team formed in 2009, Max Q effectively shut down before the 2013 season.

The No. 37 did make a single appearance at Sonoma, being fielded in an alliance with Baldwin to allow Yeley to race while his regular car, the No. 36, was fielded by Victor Gonzalez, Jr.  However, because the team was a late entry, they did not receive driver or owner points.  Yeley finished 42nd.

In 2014, TBR acquired the No. 37 outright, with Bobby Labonte driving the car at Indianapolis.  This officially marked the end of Max Q's participation in NASCAR, because although the 2013 entry had used Max Q's paint style, the 2014 entry used TBR's with Baldwin sponsor Accell Construction on board.

Car No. 37 results

Car No. 64 history

The team first attempted to field the No. 64 Toyota at the 2009 Daytona 500 for Geoff Bodine. Although he missed the race, Geoff's brother Todd Bodine made the race at Las Vegas Motor Speedway for the team's first start. The team finished 37th, 58 laps down. Todd would run two other races, garnering a 42nd and 43rd before leaving the team before the first Pocono race. Gunselman then signed Mike Wallace to run a limited schedule the rest of the year. In the remainder of the season, Wallace made two races for the team. His finishes were 43rd and 39th. At Martinsville Speedway, Derrike Cope took over Gunselman's car for one race. The team qualified 43rd and finished 42nd. In 2009, the team made six races in eighteen attempts and did not finish a single one (two engine failures, two brake issues, one crash, and one instance of being parked).

The team's first race of 2010 was at Richmond in a Toyota with Tony Raines driving. Chad McCumbee, Landon Cassill, Jeff Green and Todd Bodine also competed for the team. Gunselman Motorsports ran in 2010 as a Start and Park team, with support from Germain Racing.

For 2011, Todd Bodine was intended to run with Gunselman for the Daytona 500. However, Germain Racing fielded their own No. 60 Toyota for Bodine. Former Daytona 500 winner Derrike Cope drove the No. 64 Toyota in the Bud Shootout, but failed to qualify the Daytona 500 with sponsorship from Sta-Bil Ethanol Treatment. Max Q would go on to end its affiliation with Germain Racing and Toyota following Daytona.  After Daytona, the No. 64 became Max Q’s secondary team, with the new No. 37 becoming the primary.  The team only chose to field the No. 64 one additional time, which was at the Sprint Showdown.  Cope again drove the car, but was involved in a crash with Landon Cassill.

Car No. 64 results

References

External links 
 
 

Defunct NASCAR teams
Auto racing teams established in 2009
Auto racing teams disestablished in 2013